The first USS Jarvis (DD-38) was a modified  in the United States Navy during World War I. She was named for James C. Jarvis.

Jarvis was laid down by the New York Shipbuilding Company, Camden, New Jersey on 1 July 1911; launched on 4 April 1912; sponsored by Mrs. Jean King; and commissioned on 22 October 1912, Lieutenant Commander D. P. Mannix in command.

Pre-World War I
Following shakedown off Cuba, Jarvis spent a year operating out of Norfolk, Virginia in the Caribbean. She departed Pensacola, Florida on 20 April 1914 for patrols off Tampico and Veracruz, Mexico, during the US occupation of Veracruz. Returning to Norfolk on 16 June, she operated in the Atlantic until departing New York on 26 May 1917 to join US Naval Forces operating in European waters under Vice Admiral William Sims.

World War I
Arriving in Queenstown, Ireland, via St. Nazaire, France on 11 June, she commenced patrol and escort duty along the Irish and English coasts. The operations of destroyers such as Jarvis were of immense value to the Allies in overcoming the German U-boat menace. While not credited with sinking any U-boats, on two occasions Jarvis rescued crews of ships torpedoed by enemy submarines. On 19 June she rescued 41 survivors of SS Batoum off the Irish coast, and she pulled 22 survivors of the British merchantman Purley from the North Sea on 25 July. After recovering Batoums survivors, she braved a possible torpedo attack and positioned herself between SS Mechanician and a U-boat to protect the merchant ship from enemy torpedoes.

Jarvis operated out of Queenstown until 15 February 1918, when she sailed to Brest, France to guard Allied shipping along the French coast. She patrolled out of Brest until 28 December; then she sailed for the United States. Arriving at Philadelphia, Pennsylvania on 12 January 1919, she resumed operations along the Atlantic Coast. Jarvis returned to Philadelphia on 21 July and decommissioned on 26 November. To comply with the terms of the London Naval Treaty, she was scrapped and her materials sold on 23 April 1935.

References

External links
 

 

Paulding-class destroyers
Monaghan-class destroyers
World War I destroyers of the United States
Ships built by New York Shipbuilding Corporation
1912 ships